Singalongs is the second studio album released by Latvian instrumental cello rock trio Melo-M. The album is produced by trio member Kārlis Auzāns and recorded 2007 at Chellout Studios in Riga, Latvia. The album consists of 11 cover version tracks.

Personnel 
Kārlis Auzāns (alias Charlie Lee)  - Cello, vocals (track 1, 3 and 6).
Valters Pūce (alias Walis Shmuls) - Cello.
Antons Trocjuks (alias Tonny Trolly) - Cello.
Vilnis Krieviņš - Drums (track 1, 2, 4 to 11.
Andris Buikis - Drums (track 3).

Track listing 

2007 albums
Melo-M albums